Hallam may refer to:

Places
 Hallam, Victoria, Australia
 Hallam railway station

UK
 Hallamshire, an area in South Yorkshire, England, UK
 Royal Hallamshire Hospital
 Sheffield Hallam (UK Parliament constituency)
 Sheffield Hallam University
 Hallam Tower, a high rise building in the Fulwood area of Sheffield
 Roman Catholic Diocese of Hallam
 West Hallam in Derbyshire, England, UK
 West Hallam railway station
 Hallam Street, Marylebone, London, England, UK

USA
 Hallam, Nebraska, United States
 Hallam Nuclear Power Facility, a nuclear reactor
 Hallam, Pennsylvania, United States

Other uses
Hallam (surname)
 Reuben Hallam, author, who wrote in the Sheffield dialect
 Hallam F.C. - a non-league football club in Sheffield
 Hallam FM, a radio station based in Sheffield

See also

 
Halam (disambiguation)